Bioptics is a combinatorial vision-correction refractive surgical technique performed by ophthalmologists, in which refractive error of the eye is treated on both the lenticular and corneal optical planes. The dual technique was pioneered, and the term coined, by Roberto Zaldívar. The procedure is increasing in popularity (as of 2006).

References

Surgical procedures and techniques
Ophthalmology